William Miller "Big Bill" Gatewood (August 22, 1881 – December 8, 1962) was an American Negro league baseball pitcher and manager for several years before the founding of the first Negro National League, and in its first few seasons.  He pitched for the Leland Giants, Chicago Giants, St. Paul Colored Gophers, Chicago American Giants, New York Lincoln Giants, Cuban X-Giants, Philadelphia Giants, Brooklyn Royal Giants, St. Louis Giants, Indianapolis ABCs, Detroit Stars, St. Louis Stars, Toledo Tigers, Milwaukee Bears, Memphis Red Sox, Atlantic City Bacharach Giants, and Birmingham Black Barons.

Career
Sportswriter Harry Daniels named Gatewood to his 1909 "All American Team."

In the first week of June in 1920, at age 38, Gatewood left the St. Louis Giants and joined Tenny Blount's team, the Detroit Stars. Part-way through the second season, he moved on to the Cuban Stars.

A 6'7" tall spitball pitcher, Gatewood was a first line pitcher in Blackball's pre-league days, and pitched the first no-hitter in NNL league play, beating the Cincinnati Cuban Stars on June 6, 1921.  As his pitching skills deteriorated, he remained in the game as a manager.

Gatewood managed the St. Louis Stars and Birmingham Black Barons.  He is credited with giving Negro leagues great James Cool Papa Bell his famous nickname, and for convincing him to learn to switch hit in order to take advantage of his speed. Gatewood is also credited with teaching Satchel Paige his "hesitation pitch" while managing him in Birmingham.

After Gatewood died, he was buried in an unmarked grave and did not receive a proper headstone until a Society for American Baseball Research group called the Negro Leagues Baseball Grave Marker Project installed a proper gravestone in 2010. Gatewood's grave did not have a headstone for about 48 years.

References

Sources
 The Biographical Encyclopedia of the Negro Baseball Leagues  by James A. Riley {1994} Publisher: Carroll & Graf (New York NY) 
 Draft registration card, 1918, National Archives & Records Administration

External links
 and Baseball-Reference Black Baseball stats and Seamheads
  and Seamheads
 A Legacy Written in Stone - The Columbia Tribune

1881 births
1962 deaths
Baseball pitchers
Negro league baseball managers
Leland Giants players
Chicago American Giants players
Lincoln Giants players
Cuban X-Giants players
Philadelphia Giants players
Brooklyn Royal Giants players
St. Louis Giants players
Indianapolis ABCs players
Detroit Stars players
St. Louis Stars (baseball) players
Toledo Tigers players
Milwaukee Bears players
Memphis Red Sox players
Bacharach Giants players
Birmingham Black Barons players
St. Paul Colored Gophers players
Baseball players from San Antonio
Sportspeople from Columbia, Missouri
20th-century African-American people